David Shahar (1926-1997) was an Israeli fiction writer, translator, and editor best known for his depiction of old Jerusalem in the multi-volume historical saga The Palace of Shattered Vessels (1968–94).

Life and work
He was born in Jerusalem in June 1926, to a pious ultra-orthodox Jewish family that had lived in the city for several generations. His ancestors arrived in Jerusalem in the 19th century, from Hungary on his father's side and the Russian Empire on his mother's side. According to family stories, his father's side was descended from Jews expelled from Spain in 1492.

Shahar studied at the Hebrew University in Jerusalem. He was involved with the Irgun Tzvai Leumi and the Canaanite movement, and identified as an Orthodox Jewish, ultranationalist, right-wing writer.

Shahar's series of novels The Palace of Shattered Vessels is recognized by many as his masterpiece, considered a realist depiction of life in pre-State Jerusalem. Regarded as an Israeli version of Proust by French and some Israeli critics, he won the Prix Medicis Etranger and the title of Commander in the Ordre des Arts et des Lettres. He also won Israeli literary awards such as the Bialik Prize, the Agnon Prize and the Prime Minister's Prize for Hebrew Literary Works.

He had two children with the medieval historian Shulamith Shahar, one of them was the Israelian sinologist, 	
Meir Shahar. He died in Paris in 1997. Poet and chemist Avner Treinin spoke at his funeral when Shahar was buried on the Mount of Olives.

Works

Short story collections
Concerning Dreams (1955) [Al Ha-Chalomot]
Caesar (1960) [Keisar]
The Fortune Teller (1966) [Magid Ha-Atidot]
The Death of the Little God (1970) [Moto Shel Ha-Elohim Ha-Katan]
The Popeʹs Moustache (1971) [Sfamo Shel Ha-Apifyor]

Novels
Moon of Honey and Gold (1959) [Yerach Ha-Dvash Ve-Ha-Zahav]
Riki’s Secret (1960) [Sodo Shel Riki: Harpatkotav Shel Riki Maoz]
Summer in the Street of the Prophets [The Palace of Shattered Vessels, vol. 1] (1969) [Kayitz Be-Derech Ha-Neviʹim]
A Voyage to Ur of the Chaldees [The Palace of Shattered Vessels, vol. 2] (1971) [Ha-Masa Le-Ur Kasdim]
The Day of the Countess [The Palace of Shattered Vessels, vol. 3] (1976) [Yom Ha-Rozenet]
His Majestyʹs Agent (1979) [Sochen Hod Malchuto]
Nin-Gal [The Palace of Shattered Vessels, vol. 4] (1983) [Ningal; Nin-Gal]
Day of the Ghosts [The Palace of Shattered Vessels, vol. 5] (1986) [Yom Ha-Refaʹim]
A Tammuz Nightʹs Dream [The Palace of Shattered Vessels, vol. 6] (1988) [Chalom Leil Tammuz]
Nights of Lutetia [The Palace of Shattered Vessels] (1991) [Leilot Lutetzia]
On Candles and Winds [The Palace of Shettered Vessels, vol. 7] (1994) [Al Ha-Ner Ve-Al Ha-Ruach]
To the Mount of Olives (posthumously published fragment) (1998)

Translations into Hebrew
Selected Scandinavian Stories (1953) [Mivḥar Ha-Sipur ha-Skandinavi]
Selected Japanese Stories edited by Donald Keene (1957) [Mivḥar Ha-Sipur Ha-Yapani]
Napoleon's Letters edited by J. M. Thompson (196-?) [Mikhteve Napoleon]
Zen Wisdom (1971) [Hokhmat Zen]
The Power and the Glory by Graham Greene (1991) [Ha-Oz Veha-Tiferet]

Books in English translation
News from Jerusalem: Stories, trans. Dalya Bilu, et al. (Boston: Houghton Mifflin, 1973)
The Palace of Shattered Vessels, trans. Dalya Bilu (Boston: Houghton Mifflin, 1975) [vol. 1, Summer in the Street of the Prophets]
His Majesty's Agent, trans. Dalya Bilu (New York: Harcourt Brace Jovanovich, 1980)
The Palace of Shattered Vessels: Summer in the Street of the Prophets; and, A Voyage to Ur of the Chaldees, trans. Dalya Bilu (New York: Weidenfeld & Nicolson, 1988) [vols. 1 and 2]

References

Further reading
 
 
 
 
 

20th-century Israeli writers
Recipients of Prime Minister's Prize for Hebrew Literary Works
Writers from Jerusalem
Prix Médicis étranger winners
Commandeurs of the Ordre des Arts et des Lettres
1926 births
1997 deaths